"My Church" is the first single by American country music singer Maren Morris. It was released in January 2016 as the lead single from her first studio album, Hero (2016). Morris co-wrote and co-produced the song with busbee. The song won the award for Best Country Solo Performance and was nominated for Best Country Song at the 59th Annual Grammy Awards.

Content
The church in the song is used figuratively to describe the sanctuary that the narrator feels is her car when she plays music on the Highway FM radio while driving. It refers to listening to country icons like Johnny Cash and Hank Williams and is about "the simple joy that comes with turning up the volume, rolling down the windows and singing along to the radio at 65 miles an hour []". She compares the experience to a church revival, saying, "Yeah, I guess that's my church." She co-wrote and co-produced the single with busbee.

The song is composed in the key of A major in a 4/4 time signature with a "shuffle" tempo of approximately 76 beats per minute. It follows the chord pattern A-D-A-E-A twice. Morris' vocals range from E to C.

Music video
The music video was premiered in January 2016. It shows Morris driving an early 1970s Mercedes Sedan, and picking up various passengers along the way. The man on the motorcycle is played by the actor Oryan West.

Critical reception
Billy Dukes of Taste of Country rated the song as a "Critic's Pick", writing that "She's a mix of Amy Winehouse, Little Big Town and pulp fiction. Beautiful images and ideas swirl around lo-fi instrumentation... A little sweetness seeps through during this soulful, blues-influenced jam".

Rolling Stone named "My Church" one of the 30 best songs of the first half of 2016. "Some keep the Sabbath going to church. Breakout Nashville star Maren Morris keeps it blazing down the freeway listening to classic country radio – with Hank Williams delivering the sermon and Johnny Cash leading the choir. Honoring tradition, this joyous popwise stomper keeps it moving forward."

Billboard ranked "My Church" at number 15 on its "100 Best Pop Songs of 2016" list. "Talk about finding your religion: On this undeniable singalong, country’s hottest newcome[r] of 2016 takes us to church via this love letter to driving with the windows down, while country radio preaches to your solo choir. Fittingly, it navigated Billboard’s Country Airplay chart for 22 weeks, even earning Maren Morris a trip to the top 10. Not a bad blessing for your first major-label single." In Village Voice's annual Pazz & Jop mass critics poll of the year's best in music in 2016, "My Church" was ranked at number 29, tied with Rihanna's "Kiss It Better" and The Weeknd's "Starboy".

Accolades

Chart performance
According to Columbia Nashville, the song set a record as the song played by the greatest number of radio stations for a debut single in its impact week,  107, beating the previous record of 99. It entered the Country Airplay chart at number 59. It first entered the Hot Country Songs chart at number 38 for the week of January 30, 2016, selling 6,000 copies that week. It entered the Billboard Hot 100 chart two weeks later and reached number one on the Country Digital Songs chart in another four weeks. In the US, the song had sold over 974,000 digital copies by July 2017.

Charts

Weekly charts

Year-end charts

Certifications

References

2016 debut singles
2016 songs
Maren Morris songs
Columbia Nashville Records singles
Songs written by busbee
Songs written by Maren Morris
Song recordings produced by busbee
Songs about cars
Songs about country music